Michel François (31 August 1906 – 11 July 1981) was a French archivist, palaeographer and historian.

Biography 
Michel François joined the École Nationale des Chartes in 1927 and graduated first place in the 1931 class with a thesis entitled Histoire des comtes et du comté de Vaudémont au Moyen Âge, which earned him the Molinier prize and was published soon after by the Lorraine Archaeological Society. His rank output led to his being appointed a member of the French School of Rome. He joined the Palazzo Farnese in 1932 after his military service.

After he returned to France, he was appointed attached to the manuscripts cabinet of the Bibliothèque nationale on 1 January 1934, where he wrote, with Philippe Lauer, a valuable guide to sources of the religious history of France in the manuscripts department. He was appointed to the Archives nationales on 1 May 1935.

Attracted to teaching, he supplied Robert Marichal from 1942 to 1945, then a POW in Germany, to the chair of language and French literature from the Middle Ages at the Institut catholique de Paris. In 1942-1943, he provided locum for Charles Samaran in his Latin and French palaeography conference at the École pratique des hautes études. On 3 November 1949, he was appointed master of conference of medieval history at the Institut Catholique de Paris; He became an assistant professor in 1952 and professor in 1955. Finally, on 1 October 1953 he succeeded Charles Perrat to the chair of history of political, administrative and judicial of France at the École des chartes.

He also taught at the Sorbonne from 1954 to 1977, an introductory course to historical research, renamed "course of historiography and archiving" in 1967. In 1964, at the death of Alain Dain, he was elected dean of the Faculty of Arts of the Institut catholique and member of the Académie des Inscriptions et Belles-Lettres in 1969. On 1 October 1970 he was appointed director of the École des Chartes in replacement of Pierre Marot.

French librarians
French medievalists
French archivists
French palaeographers
École Nationale des Chartes alumni
Members of the Académie des Inscriptions et Belles-Lettres
Commandeurs of the Légion d'honneur
Commandeurs of the Ordre des Palmes Académiques
Knights Grand Cross of the Order of St Gregory the Great
Officers Crosses of the Order of Merit of the Federal Republic of Germany
1906 births
People from Vosges (department)
1981 deaths